Halina Pawlowská (born 21 March 1955) is a Czech playwright, short story writer, journalist and editor. She has worked as a screenwriter and show presenter for Czech television.

Biography 
Born in Prague, Pawlowská attended a local grammar school before studying dramaturgy and scriptwriting at the Film and TV School of the Academy of Performing Arts where she graduated in 1981. She then worked as a screenwriter for Czech Television, took part in various entertainment programmes, and later became a presenter. She has also been a columnist or editor for various Czech newspapers and journals. Now one of the Czech Republic's most successful writers, her short stories and television series are often based on her world of young adults with amusing interpretations of love or chaotic marriages.

Works

Books 
 Zoufalé ženy dělají zoufalé věci, 1993
 Díky za každé nové ráno, 1994
 Proč jsem se neoběsila, 1994
 Ať zešílí láskou, 1995
 Ó, jak ti závidím, 1995 
 Jak být šťastný: dvanáct nemorálních rad, 1996
 Hroši nepláčou, 1996 
 Charakter mlčel, a mluvilo tělo, 1997
 Dá-li pánbůh zdraví, i hříchy budou, 1998
 Banánové rybičky, 2000
 Banánové chybičky, 2003
 Tři v háji, 2004 
 Záhada žlutých žabek, 2005
 Velká žena z Východu, 2011
 Strašná Nádhera , 2012

Film and television scripts 
 Evo, vdej se!, 1983
 Můj hříšný muž, 1986
 Malé dějiny jedné rodiny, 1988/89 
 Vrať se do hrobu!, 1989 
 Díky za každé nové ráno, 1993
 Bubu a Filip, 1996 – TV series
 O mé rodině a jiných mrtvolách, 2011 
 Doktoři z Počátků, 2013 
 U Haliny v kuchyni, 2014

Appearances as an actress 
 Jak básníkům chutná život, 1987 
 Vrať se do hrobu!, 1989
 Zálety koňského handlíře, 1991
 Díky za každé nové ráno, 1993

References 

1955 births
Living people
Writers from Prague
Czech women journalists
20th-century Czech dramatists and playwrights
Czech journalists
Czech women dramatists and playwrights
Czech television presenters
20th-century Czech women writers
21st-century Czech dramatists and playwrights
21st-century Czech women writers
Women television writers
Czech screenwriters
Czech women screenwriters
Czech women television presenters
Academy of Performing Arts in Prague alumni